Colin Sullivan may refer to:

 Colin Sullivan (physician), Australian physician, professor and inventor
 Colin Sullivan (footballer) (born 1951), English former footballer
Colin Sullivan, character in The Departed